Bermeo is a railway station in Bermeo, Basque Country, Spain. It is owned by Euskal Trenbide Sarea and operated by Euskotren. It lies on the Urdaibai line.

History 
The station opened as the northern terminus of the Pedernales-Bermeo extension of the Amorebieta-Pedernales line on 16 August 1955. A spur track was added in 1960 to serve freight traffic from the harbor. It was removed later that decade due to lack of use. A new access to the harbor was built in 1996. It was in use until 1998, when increased passenger traffic put an end to freight trains running on the line.

Services 
The station is served by Euskotren Trena line E4. It runs every 30 minutes (in each direction) during weekdays, and every hour during weekends.

References

External links
 

Euskotren Trena stations
Railway stations in Biscay
Railway stations in Spain opened in 1955